Pousse au crime et Longueurs de temps (which translates to crime incitation and lengths of time) is an Album by French Punk Band Dirty District. The album had a variety of styles, including Ska, Reggae, and an early attempt at Rap Metal. The album was heavily delayed, as the songs were recorded in February 1989 and the album was released in 1990. The CD came with short explanations (written in French) and the lyrics for each song.

Track listing
 "Putain de vélo" ('Whore Of The Bicycle')
 "Soap"
 "Dead spit"
 "U.P.P. [Urban Planning Package]"
 Rude rock & reggae
 "Church"
 "Last night down town"
 "E-way"
 "Steve biko"
 "L'homme a la tete de chiffre"
 "Blast it"
 "Dub Way"

Dirty District albums
1990 debut albums